Matt Kennedy Gould (born October 4, 1975) is an American former television personality.  He rose to prominence in 2003, when he was the protagonist of The Joe Schmo Show, a fake reality show in which, unbeknownst to him, all the participants but Gould were actors portraying broad reality show participant archetypes.

Background
Gould is a native of Mt. Lebanon, Pennsylvania, and graduated from Pennsylvania State University in 1999 with a degree in speech communications.  Gould attended the University of Pittsburgh School of Law, but dropped out prior to completion.  After dropping out, Gould began living with his parents and working as a pizza delivery man.

The Joe Schmo Show

Gould was playing basketball with friends at a Jewish Community Center in the South Hills section of Pittsburgh, Pennsylvania when a casting director for SpikeTV's The Joe Schmo Show spotted him.  Gould auditioned for the show, and was selected as its protagonist.

As far as Gould was concerned, he was competing in the reality show Lap of Luxury for a $100,000 prize to be awarded to the winner.  At the end of each show, one of the show's actors-contestants was evicted.  Halfway through the season, an older contestant with whom Gould had bonded was "voted" off the show, causing Gould to break down and begin questioning whether voting off friends was worth monetary gain.  Matters were complicated the following day when Gould accidentally injured one of the actors, Kristen Wiig, later of Saturday Night Live fame, in a sumo wrestling contest.  Upon Wiig's return to the show, Gould insisted on giving the sumo wrestling contest's prize (a vacation package) to Wiig.  Gould's acts of vulnerability in the former instance, and generosity in the latter, caused the producers to shift the show's focus and tone significantly away from mockery and towards praise.

The truth was revealed to Gould in the season's finale, which garnered the most viewers for SpikeTV for a non-wrestling show to that point.  Gould received the $100,000 prize for which he was "competing," along with a plasma television and separate vacations to Tahiti and to a spa resort. Upon the truth being revealed, Gould cried out, "What is going on?!?"  Spike TV would later air this cry at the end of its other original productions.

When asked about whether he had ever intuited the truth, Gould said that he "just chalk[ed] everything up to the oddities of reality television" and that he thought he "was on the weirdest reality show in history of mankind."

In August 2008, Entertainment Weekly interviewed Gould about his experiences on the show.  Gould said that the show made him feel "dumb" and that he "wouldn't do the show at all" if he was given the choice whether or not to do it again.

In January 2013, however, Gould stated in a new interview released the day of the premiere of the show's third season that he had "come full circle" and had made peace with the experience. He noted that he still hears from fans of the show on Facebook, that in nine years, no one has ever said anything negative to him about it, and that the fear he felt about what people would think of him was "...something I drummed up in my head."

Post-Joe Schmo Show

Appearances
Gould recorded commentary on the show for a later rebroadcast of the series.  In 2004, Gould taped an unaired cameo appearance for Joe Schmo 2 as a pizza delivery man, and appeared as a referee on 10 Things Every Guy Should Experience.

Personal life
As of 2008, Gould was married with two children. As of 2013, his family status was reported to have remained as such.

References

External links
 
 Pittsburgh Post-Gazette Article

Living people
Participants in American reality television series
Pennsylvania State University alumni
People from Mt. Lebanon, Pennsylvania
1975 births